The 2022 European Weightlifting Championships was held in Tirana, Albania, from 28 May to 5 June 2022. The event was initially scheduled to be held in Sofia, Bulgaria, but this changed after a leadership dispute.

Medal table
Source:

Ranking by Big (Total result) medals

Ranking by all medals: Big (Total result) and Small (Snatch and Clean & Jerk)

Medal overview

Men

Women

Team ranking

Men

Women

Participating countries
A total of 285 competitors from 39 nations participated.

 Belarusians and Russians weightlifters are not allowed to compete at the event after a ban as a result of the Russian invasion of Ukraine.

Most participants

Men's results
Source:

Men's 55 kg

Men's 61 kg

Men's 67 kg

Men's 73 kg

Men's 81 kg

Men's 89 kg

Men's 96 kg

Men's 102 kg

Men's 109 kg

Men's +109 kg

Women's results
Source:

Women's 45 kg

Women's 49 kg

Women's 55 kg

Women's 59 kg

Women's 64 kg

Women's 71 kg

Women's 76 kg

Women's 81 kg

Women's 87 kg

Women's +87 kg

References

External links
European Weightlifting Federation
Results
Result book

European Weightlifting Championships
European Championships
European Weightlifting Championships
International weightlifting competitions hosted by Albania
Sports competitions in Tirana
European Weightlifting Championships
European Weightlifting Championships
Weightlifting